Luss is a village on the bank of Loch Lomond, Scotland. 

Luss or LUSS may also refer to:
 Lulin Sky Survey of near-Earth objects
 Dan Luss, American professor of chemical engineering
 Sasha Luss, Russian model and actress

See also
 Central Lüß Plateau Heathland, a nature reserve in Germany